Delana Township is one of twelve townships in Humboldt County, Iowa, USA. As of the 2000 census, its population was 532.

History
Delana Township was organized in 1871.

Geography

Cities, towns, villages
 Bode

Adjacent townships
 Riverdale Township, Kossuth County (north)
 Sherman Township, Kossuth County (northeast)
 Humboldt Township (east)
 Grove Township (southeast)
 Rutland Township (south)
 Avery Township (southwest)
 Wacousta Township (west)
 Garfield Township, Kossuth County (northwest)

Cemeteries
The township contains St. Olaf Cemetery, and Union Cemetery, also Bode Memorial Park.

Political districts
 Iowa's 4th congressional district
 State House District 4

References
 United States Census Bureau 2008 TIGER/Line Shapefiles
 United States Board on Geographic Names (GNIS)
 United States National Atlas

External links
 US-Counties.com
 City-Data.com

Townships in Humboldt County, Iowa
1870 establishments in Iowa
Townships in Iowa